The GER Class N31 was a class of eighty-two 0-6-0 steam locomotives designed by James Holden for the Great Eastern Railway. Eighteen passed to the London and North Eastern Railway (LNER) at the 1923 grouping and received the LNER classification J14.

History
These goods locomotives had  cylinders,  driving wheels, and a  boiler. Eighty-one were built at Stratford Works between 1893 and 1898.

Table of orders and numbers

Class 127
In addition, when the Class 127 locomotive was rebuilt from compound to simple in 1895, it was then included into Class N31.

Performance
They were not particularly successful locomotives. Although nicknamed Swifts, they were sluggish locomotives, due to the placement of the valve chests underneath the cylinders.

Withdrawals
Withdrawals started in 1908, and by the end of 1922, only eighteen were left in service. The LNER allocated numbers 7000 higher than the locomotives' GER numbers, but withdrawals continued, and by 1925 the class was extinct.

References

External links

N31 Class 0-6-0 1891-1898 — Great Eastern Railway Society
The Class J14 (GER Class N31) 0-6-0 Locomotives — LNER Encyclopedia

N31
0-6-0 locomotives
Railway locomotives introduced in 1893
Standard gauge steam locomotives of Great Britain
Freight locomotives